Patilpada may refer to the following places in Maharashtra, India:

 Patilpada, Dahanu (census code 551603), located off Savata road
 Patilpada, Dahanu (census code 551628), located near Gadchinchale
 Patilpada, Palghar (census code 551553), located near Vilatgaon
 Patilpada, Palghar (census code 551561), located near Karajgaon
 Patilpada, Palghar (census code 551571), located near the Talasari town